Rio Del Valle Hackford (June 28, 1970 – April 14, 2022) was an American film and television actor. He was best known for playing the recurring role of Toby in the American drama television series Treme.

Life and career 
Hackford was born in Los Angeles County, California, the son of film director Taylor Hackford. He began his career in 1990, first appearing in the film Pretty Woman, where he played the uncredited role of a street junkie. Hackford appeared in films such as Safe, Exit to Eden, Déjà Vu, I Love Your Work, Blood In, Blood Out, Treasure Island, Sherrybaby and Strange Days. He played the role of Detective King in the 2006 film Stay Alive. Hackford also played the role of Grayden Nash in the 2010 film Jonah Hex.

In his television career, Hackford guest-starred in series including When Nature Calls with Helen Mirren, American Crime Story, Togetherness, Memphis Beat, Underground and True Detective. He played the recurring role of Toby in the drama television series Treme. Hackford was also the on-set portrayer of IG-11, the character being voiced by Taika Waititi. His last credit was from the biographical drama miniseries Pam & Tommy, in which he played the role of a manager.

Hackford owned clubs in New Orleans including One-Eyed Jacks, El Matador and Pal's Lounge.

Death 
Hackford died in April 2022 of uveal melanoma in Sunset Beach, California, at the age of 51.

References

External links 

Rotten Tomatoes profile

1970 births
2022 deaths
People from Los Angeles County, California
Male actors from Los Angeles County, California
Male actors from California
American male film actors
American male television actors
20th-century American male actors
21st-century American male actors
Deaths from cancer in California
Deaths from uveal melanoma